Anastasia Dețiuc and Johana Marková were the defending champions but Dețiuc chose to compete in Gdynia instead. Marková played alongside Chantal Škamlová, but they lost in the first round to Jessie Aney and Anna Sisková.

Aney and Sisková went on to win the title, defeating Bárbara Gatica and Rebeca Pereira in the final, 6–1, 6–0.

Seeds

Draw

Draw

References
Main Draw

ITS Cup - Doubles